Ribe Municipality is a former municipality in Denmark. It was located on the west coast of the Jutland peninsula and belonged to Ribe County. It was abolished effective 1 January 2007. The municipal seat was located in the town of Ribe.

The municipality covered an area of 352 km2, with a total population of 18,147 (2005). It also included the island of Manø but not nearby Fanø. Its last mayor was Preben Rudiengaard, representing the liberal political party, Venstre.

Geography
Neighboring municipalities were Gram and Rødding to the east, Holsted, Bramming to the north, and Skærbæk to the south.  Its western border was defined by the waters of the North Sea. The island of Mandø, located in the North Sea, is connected to the rest of the municipality by a road. Mandø is surrounded by the waters of Knude Deep (Knudedyb) and Juvre Deep (Juvre Dyb), respectively to the north and south of the island.

Merger
On 1 January 2007, Ribe Municipality merged with Bramming Municipality and Esbjerg Municipality, forming a new Esbjerg Municipality. This was a result of Kommunalreformen ("The Municipality Reform" of 2007). The new Esbjerg Municipality has an area of 741 km2 and a total population of 114,097 (2005) It belongs to Region of Southern Denmark.

Line notes

References
 M. Bencard. 1978. Ribe over the last 1000 years
 Municipal statistics: NetBorger Kommunefakta, delivered from KMD aka Kommunedata (Municipal Data)
 Municipal mergers and neighbors: Eniro new municipalities map

External links 
 Official tourism website
 The new Esbjerg municipality's official website (Danish only)

Esbjerg
Former municipalities of Denmark